The 1995 Harvard Crimson football team was an American football team that represented Harvard University during the 1995 NCAA Division I-AA football season. Harvard finished last in the Ivy League.

In their second year under head coach Timothy Murphy, the Crimson compiled a 2–8 record and were outscored 258 to 183. Justin Frantz was the team captain.

Harvard's 1–6 conference record placed eighth (and worst) in the Ivy League standings. The Crimson were outscored 199 to 112 by Ivy opponents.

Harvard played its home games at Harvard Stadium in the Allston neighborhood of Boston, Massachusetts.

Schedule

References

Harvard
Harvard Crimson football seasons
Harvard Crimson football
Harvard Crimson football